Portrait of Home is a Chinese language drama serial which was filmed for and broadcast on Singapore's Mediacorp TV Channel 8 in 2005. It stars Adrian Pang, Xiang Yun, Louise Lee, Richard Low, Pierre Png and Felicia Chin as the casts of the series. It is shown on weekdays at 7pm.

The show has 100 episodes telecast in two segments, the first with 60 episodes and the second with 40 episodes. Part 1 was aired from 16 May 2005 to 15 August 2005 while part 2 was aired from 11 October 2005 to 5 December 2005.

Cast

 Louise Lee as Li Tian (李甜), the wife of Zhou Dong who subsequently remarried to Lin Shitou.
 Richard Low as Lin Shitou (林石头), the second husband of Li Tian.
 Chen Shucheng as Zhou Dong (周东) and Zhang Guangyang (张光杨), Zhou is the owner of Tong Xin Yuan who disappeared after a kidnap attempt went wrong; Zhang is a good friend of Zhou and impersonates as him as he looks like Zhou.
 Xiang Yun as Zhang Xiuhua (张绣花), a staff of Tong Xin Yuan

Season 1

Season 2

Plot

The fishball factory Tong Xin Yuan is a successful local business, with thriving sales in both Singapore and overseas. But behind the company lies a dark mystery.

The founder of Tong Xin Yuan, Zhou Dong (Chen Shucheng), married a beautiful factory worker Li Tian (Louise Lee) many years ago. They had three sons – Dadi (Adrian Pang), Dashan (Yao Wenlong) and Daqiu (Cavin Soh). Zhou Dong disappeared after a kidnap attempt went awry; not even his body was found.

Without the master around, a faithful worker in Tong Xin Yuan, Lin Shitou (Richard Low) took up the task of overlooking the factory. Three years later, Shitou married Li Tian and had another 3 sons – Dahai (Terence Cao), Dayang (Pierre Png) and Dajiang (Zhang Yaodong). From then on, rumours abound that Shitou killed Zhou Dong and usurped both his factory and wife.

Tong Xin Yuan grew tremendously under Shitou and Li Tian’s management, and all six sons receive the same treatment. Li Tian, in an effort to let her children remain close by her side for as long as possible, as well as to encourage them to love and support each other, built a block of apartments with seven units inside. She lives in one of the units with her husband, with the remaining six units planned for her children. They may move into their unit only after marriage, and if they should choose not to move in, they will automatically forfeit all rights to the unit. Li Tian has even set a family regulation that no matter how busy each family member is, everyone has to turn up at her unit for a meal at least once a week.

Six half-brothers, each with their own peculiarities, often rub each other the wrong way. All of them work at the fishball factory with the exception of Dahai and Dajiang who is still in university.

Amongst the six sons, Dadi has the strangest temperament and is still single. He is nicknamed the Mad Man, and is secretly in love with their factory supervisor Xiuhua (Xiang Yun) who is a few years older than he is. Unaware of his feelings, Li Tian and Xiuhua select a Vietnamese bride Ruan Mian (Jesseca Liu) for Dadi, putting Dadi in an awkward position.

Dashan had a sad past in his youth, falling into despair after witnessing the death of his beloved girlfriend. He fell into bad company and started taking drugs. Upon release from the drug rehabilitation centre, he meets cunning Su Haitang (Le Yao) who bears a great resemblance to his deceased girlfriend. He would have fallen into Haitang’s trap if not for the appearance of the kind-hearted Yang Qin. He have the tendency to let his heart rule over his head which hindered him further to achieve greater things in life.

The scheming Daqiu married a shrewd Baozhu (Cynthia Koh). He constantly plots to take over Tong Xin Yuan but all his attempts fail. In contrast, his honest and straightforward brother Dayang marries Baozhu’s sincere younger sister Baobei (Felicia Chin). The two work hard to earn an honest living despite frequent efforts by Daqiu and his wife to put them down. Heaven seems to be watching out for Dayang and Baobei as they succeed in their lives.

Dahai who spends most of his time working as a scriptwriter, marries a young lady from a wealthy family, Gao Jimei (Apple Hong). He goes against his mother's wishes by doing so and even moves into Jimei's household. Through his wife, he gets to know Fyn (Yvonne Lim) who has turned up for revenge, thereby putting both Jimei and his life in unnecessary danger.

Dajiang is still in university. He changes girlfriends constantly just like changing his clothes every now and then as he prefers something fresh and new. He always like to try out new things and yearn for changes but he harbours no great ambition.

How do Dadi, Dashan and Daqiu feel about their father Zhou Dong’s mysterious disappearance? Shitou wishes to hand Tong Xin Yuan over to Zhou Dong’s flesh and blood Daqiu, but Li Tian objects vehemently.

Daqiu schemes to take back Tong Xin Yuan, unite his two brothers, and chase Shitou and sons out of the family. The family is turned topsy-turvy furthermore when the supposedly deceased Zhou Dong suddenly turns up!

Music

Awards and nominations
It was nominated for 6 awards, it won 2 out of 6 awards.

Star Awards 2005

Star Awards 2006

Asian Television Awards 2006

Star Awards 2007

References

Singapore Chinese dramas
2005 Singaporean television series debuts
2005 Singaporean television seasons
Channel 8 (Singapore) original programming